Weinhold is a surname. Notable people with the surname include:

Adolf Ferdinand Weinhold (1841–1917), German chemist and physician
Ashley Weinhold (born 1989), American tennis player
Max Weinhold (born 1982), German field hockey player (goalkeeper)
Werner Weinhold (born 1949), former German NVA soldier

See also
Wienhold